York University is a private college affiliated with the Churches of Christ and located in York, Nebraska. It was founded in 1890.

History
York University was founded in 1890 by the United Brethren Church as York College. In 1946 the merger of the United Brethren Church and the Evangelical Church (see Evangelical Association) transferred control of the school to the Evangelical United Brethren Church. In 1956 the church transferred control to members of the Churches of Christ. The university has more than 7,500 alumni. Average enrollment is around 650 students.

In 2021, it was announced that York College would become York University, which it did so on July 1, 2022.

Campus
The university's campus is situated on fifty acres of land and includes seventeen major buildings.

Facilities include the Bartholomew Performing Arts Center (built in 2015) that serves as home for the music and theater departments; the Campbell Activity Center (built in 2012) which provides a home for chapel, intramurals and other student events; the Holthus Field House (built in 2003), a 35,000 square-foot indoor athletics practice facility; and the Kiplinger Apartments and Gibbs Hall (both built in 2006), apartment-style residence halls for upper classmen. The Mackey Center (built in 1998), with its readily identifiable clock tower, houses the admissions office, cafeteria and the Clayton Museum of Ancient History featuring the Stanback Collection. Along with newer facilities, the campus also includes several classic university structures built in the early 20th century. Though not originally part of campus, the Prayer Chapel (built in 1901) was moved from its original site in 1999, restored, and is now a focal point for the university and the York community. A well-developed park-like setting unifies the campus, providing a great atmosphere for campus activities and learning.

Academics
The university provides both residential, traditional undergraduate education and online, non-traditional programs. Baccalaureate degrees offered include the Bachelor of Arts, Bachelor of Business Administration, Bachelor of Music, and Bachelor of Science. York University also offers the Master of Arts through York University Online.

York University is accredited by the Higher Learning Commission. The institution's teacher education program is accredited by the Council for the Accreditation of Educator Preparation (CAEP).

Students and faculty
York's student-to-faculty ratio is 13:1. On-campus student enrollment is typically around 450 in the fall semester with a typical class size of 22. About 200 students are enrolled in the university's online program. The on-campus student population includes students from 30 states and 10 countries.

Student life
Co-curricular activities include 14 athletic teams, Christian outreach and service groups, performance ensembles, social clubs, literary publications, honor societies and a wide range of intramural sports.

Athletics
The York athletic teams are called the Panthers. The university is a member of the National Association of Intercollegiate Athletics (NAIA), primarily competing in the Kansas Collegiate Athletic Conference since the 2016–17 academic year. They were also a member of the National Christian College Athletic Association (NCCAA), primarily competing as an independent in the Central Region of the Division I level. The Eagles previously competed in the defunct Midlands Collegiate Athletic Conference (MCAC) from 1994–95 to 2014–15 (when the conference dissolved); as well as an NAIA Independent within the Association of Independent Institutions (AII) during the 2015–16 school year.

York competes in 20 intercollegiate varsity sports: Men's sports include baseball, basketball, cross country, golf, soccer, track & field (indoor and outdoor) and wrestling; while women's sports include basketball, cross country, golf, soccer, softball, track & field (indoor and outdoor), volleyball and wrestling; and co-ed sports include cheerleading, dance and eSports.

eSports
York added a co-ed varsity eSports team in the fall 2021 semester (2021–22 school year). The Panthers will compete in the National Association of Collegiate eSports (NACE).

References

External links
 
 York College Athletics website

 
1890 establishments in Nebraska
Buildings and structures in York County, Nebraska
Council for Christian Colleges and Universities
Educational institutions established in 1890